Charlize Theron is a South African-American actress and producer who has received various awards and nominations, including one Academy Award and one Golden Globe Award. Additionally, she has been nominated for two Academy Awards, three British Academy Film Awards, and one Primetime Emmy Award. In 2005, Theron received a star on the Hollywood Walk of Fame for her contributions to the motion picture industry.

In 1999, Theron starred in Lasse Hallström's drama The Cider House Rules. For her performance, she won the Bambi Award for Shooting Star: Female, and was nominated for the Satellite Award for Best Supporting Actress – Motion Picture. Theron's breakthrough role in the critically acclaimed biographical crime drama Monster (2003) won her the Academy Award for Best Actress, the Critics' Choice Movie Award for Best Actress, the Screen Actors Guild Award for Outstanding Performance by a Female Actor in a Leading Role, the Golden Globe Award for Best Actress in a Motion Picture – Drama, and she was nominated for the BAFTA Award for Best Actress in a Leading Role. In 2005, Theron starred in Niki Caro's drama North Country as a single mother and iron worker experiencing sexual harassment. Her performance went on to win the Desert Palm Achievement Award, the Hollywood Actress Award, and she was nominated for the Academy Award for Best Actress, the BAFTA Award for Best Actress in a Leading Role, and the Golden Globe Award for Best Actress in a Motion Picture – Drama.

In 2015, Theron starred in Mad Max: Fury Road as Imperator Furiosa opposite Tom Hardy. Theron received widespread acclaim for her performance, and winning the Critics' Choice Movie Award for Best Actress in an Action Movie, the MTV Movie Award for Best Female Performance, the Saturn Award for Best Actress, and was nominated for the AACTA International Award for Best Actress, the AACTA Award for Best Actress in a Leading Role, and the Washington D.C. Area Film Critics Association Award for Best Actress. In 2019, Theron starred in Jay Roach's drama Bombshell, based upon the accounts of the women at Fox News who set out to expose CEO Roger Ailes for sexual harassment. Theron's performance in the film garnered critical acclaim and earned her nominations for the Academy Award for Best Actress, the BAFTA Award for Best Actress in a Leading Role, and the Golden Globe Award for Best Actress in a Motion Picture – Drama.

Accolades

Honors

Notes

References

External links 
 

Charlize Theron
Theron, Charlize